Tyquian Terrel Bowman (born March 23, 1999), professionally known by his stage name Quando Rondo, is an American rapper, singer and songwriter. He was signed to YoungBoy's Never Broke Again record label and Atlantic Records. He initially gained attention with the release of his song "I Remember" featuring Lil Baby in January 2018, leading to him dropping three mixtapes, Life B4 Fame (2018), Life After Fame (2018), and From the Neighborhood to the Stage (2019).

Early life 
Tyquian Bowman was born and raised in Savannah, Georgia. He showed an early interest in music as a child. As a teenager, he spent some time in juvenile detention centers. In 2017, he spent months in county jail and was released in October. At that time, he decided to pursue music full-time. During his teenage years, he also joined the Savannah and Atlanta subset of the Rollin' 60s Neighborhood Crips.

His stage name is a play on his nickname, "Quando". He is also a fan of the basketball player, Rajon Rondo. He grew up listening to Chief Keef, Rich Homie Quan, Young Thug, and Camoflauge.

Career

2017–2019: Career beginnings, Life B4 Fame, Life After Fame and From the Neighborhood to the Stage 

Bowman adopted his stage name "Quando Rondo" in 2017. It derives from his nickname "Ty-Quando" and "Rondo" was added as he liked the sound of it. Quando's earliest song is dated back to March 1, 2017, after uploading a track titled "Gangsta Bitch" directly to his official SoundCloud page.

In November 2017, after being released from jail, he made a freestyle that he wrote while incarcerated titled “I Remember” on YouTube, which went viral quickly. In January 2018, he released the song "I Remember", featuring rapper Lil Baby. He followed that up with the release of the songs "Motivation" and "Paradise". The videos for all three songs accumulated millions of views on YouTube. This led to the release of his debut mixtape Life B4 Fame on April 17, 2018. Guest appearances such as Lil Baby, Lil Durk, and OMB Peezy. The mixtape also featured Quando's viral track, "ABG" which has accumulated over 71 million views on WorldStarHipHops official YouTube channel.

In June 2018, Quando Rondo released the single "Kiccin' Shit". Later that month, it was announced that he was the first signee to YoungBoy Never Broke Again's Atlantic Records imprint, Never Broke Again. Following the announcement, Quando's Life B4 Fame was re-released through the NBA, Atlantic imprint.

In August of that year, he and Kevin Gates were featured on the YoungBoy Never Broke Again song, "I Am Who They Say I Am". The following month, Quando Rondo was featured on three of the four tracks of YoungBoy Never Broke Again's 4Loyalty EP.

On September 24, 2018, Quando Rondo released his sophomore mixtape, Life After Fame, a sequel to his debut. The album featured guest verses from Boosie Badazz, JayDaYoungan, Rich Homie Quan, Shy Glizzy, YK Osiris, and NBA YoungBoy. The mixtape proceeded to peak at #174 on the Billboard 200, marking his first entry. He went on to open for SOB X RBE on select tour dates in the United States on their "Global Gangin" tour, which was scheduled to end in December 2018.

In February 2019, Quando Rondo released the single "Scarred from Love", which appeared on his third mixtape, From the Neighborhood to the Stage, released on May 10, 2019. The mixtape features guest appearances from BlocBoy JB, NoCap, Polo G and Shy Glizzy. The mixtape peaked at #22 on the Billboard 200.

2020–2021: Career beginnings, QPac, Diary of a Lost Child and Still Taking Risks 

He released his debut studio album, QPac, on January 10, 2020, through Never Broke Again and Atlantic. The album features guest appearances from 2 Chainz, A Boogie wit da Hoodie, Lil Durk, Luh Kel, and Polo G. The album was preceded by five singles, "Just Keep Going", "Double C's", "Marvelous" featuring Polo G, "Collect Calls", "Bad Vibe" featuring 2 Chainz and A Boogie wit da Hoodie. The album peaked at #22 on the Billboard 200. 

Quando's fourth mixtape Diary of a Lost Child	 was released on August 26, 2020, in the middle of the week, on a Wednesday. Months later, on December 4, 2020, Quando released a YouTube exclusive mixtape, Before My Time Up.

Following months of controversy surrounding his alleged involvement in King Von's death, Quando released his sixth mixtape, Still Taking Risks, on May 7, 2021. The mixtape has no features, consisting of 15 tracks and three bonus records.

2022–present: 3860 and Recovery 

On November 25, 2022, Quando teamed up with YoungBoy Never Broke Again  for their collaborative mixtape, 3860. The mixtape was preceded by four singles, "Give Me a Sign," Cream Soda" (Performed by Quando), "Keep Me Dry," and "It's On." Despite the project being uploaded to YoungBoy's YouTube channel, on the day of the mixtape's release, YoungBoy revealed that he did not want the mixtape to be released due to his past disputes with Atlantic Records, the label under which the mixtape was released under, subsequently leading to the removal of the mixtape from YoungBoy's YouTube channel. YoungBoy further noted that Quando respected his wishes for the mixtape to not be released, however, Atlantic Records proceeded to release the project.

"Give Me A Sign", with YoungBoy, would appear on Quando Rondo's sophomore studio album, Recovery, on the twentieth track, marking the album's lead single. Four other singles would be released prior to the album. "Speeding", the album's second single was released on January 22, 2023. "Long Live Pabb", the album's third single dedicated to the death of Lul Pab was released just a day later on January 23, 2023. "Me First", the album's fourth single was released on February 15, 2023. The album's final single, "Tear It Down", was released on March 9, 2023, prior to the album's official announcement.

Controversies

March 2019 assault lawsuit 
On March 12, 2019, it was reported that Rondo and YoungBoy Never Broke Again had a suit filed by a man claiming to be the rappers' bodyguard, tour manager and/or tour DJ for assault, battery and emotional distress. The lawsuit claims that on December 21, 2018, during a concert in Florence, South Carolina, the two performers were annoyed by a crazed fan resulting in an argument. The claimant states that he, Gaulden, Bowman and members of their entourage were escorted backstage by management, venue owners and concert organizers where he claims to have been assaulted by the two aforementioned. The person, who claimed he was confronted by the two defendants, commented that Bowman (although unprovoked) instigated the incident by attempting to force him back onstage to break up the fan craze to secure his team, but after he refused, Bowman and Gaulden immediately assaulted him as he tried to explain to both parties of his deeds. It resulted in the victim sustaining a "cracked tooth, bloody face and injuries to his reputation". Gaulden's attorney stated that he had no prior knowledge of the incident, but would look into the outcome of the lawsuit.

Altercation with King Von 
On November 6, 2020, an altercation broke out between the crews of rappers King Von and Quando Rondo outside an Atlanta nightclub, leading to a shoot-out that resulted in the death of the former rapper. Quando and his entourage claimed that they were acting in self-defense and Von was the aggressor; TMZ reported that previous to the brawl, Quando was napping in a car outside the nightclub, awaking to find King Von and his crew angrily approaching him and his associates. There was footage of Von throwing punches at Quando Rondo's crew, prior to the gunfight. Surveillance videos also showed Rondo helping "Lul Timm" get to the hospital afterwards. 

Quando Rondo publicly remained silent on the incident until two weeks later, when he released his song "End of Story", which was assumed to be a reference to Von's song trilogy, "Crazy Story". In the song, he recalls the shooting and addresses his involvement. In the song, he again states that he was defending himself and even shows support for his friend Timothy Leeks, a rapper also known as Lul Timm, who was charged for the murder of King Von. In April 2021, Quando denied that the song was a diss toward Von, and claimed he did not know that Von had songs with that title. Despite receiving strong criticism, Quando has continued to publicly support Leeks.

Relationship with high school student 
In October 2021, then-22-year-old Rondo was harshly criticized after it was revealed he was allegedly in a romantic relationship with a girl who was a senior in high school at the time. "While it's possible for a senior to be over eighteen years old, some think it's a strange decision for Quando to be going public with his new girl, given the fact that she may be underage", wrote HotNewHipHop.

Los Angeles shooting
On August 19, 2022, Bowman and others were reportedly shot at in Los Angeles. Bowman's friend, who went by the name Lul Pab, was killed in the shooting.

Discography 

 QPac (2020)
 Recovery (2023)

References

External links 
Official website

Living people
1999 births
Atlantic Records artists
Rappers from Georgia (U.S. state)
Musicians from Savannah, Georgia
Southern hip hop musicians
21st-century American rappers
21st-century American male musicians
African-American male rappers
21st-century African-American male singers
Trap musicians
Crips